Erin Pauling Paré (born 1979) is a  Republican member of the North Carolina General Assembly representing the state's 37th House district.

Life and career 
Paré grew up in Herndon, Virginia. She has a B.A. in Government International Politics and an M.A. in International Commerce and Policy from George Mason University. She and her husband Wayne are the owners of a sporting goods store. She lives in Holly Springs, North Carolina.

Political career
Paré won the election on November 3, 2020, representing the Republican Party. She secured fifty percent of the vote while her closest rival, Democrat Sydney Batch secured forty-seven percent.

Paré only raised $224,642 in defeating the incumbent Sydney Batch, who raised $1,119,469.

Paré faced some scrutiny for her failure to recuse herself during her vote on HB 83, which would allow veterans who served in the military for at least 20 years to be exempt from income tax on their retirement pay, a program for which her husband would qualify.

Paré has also sponsored legislation that would increase money for school vouchers, taking funding away from public schools. In addition, she voted for House Bill 398, which would have repealed North Carolina's requirement that individuals who purchase pistols get a permit from their county sheriff. When the bill was being debated, Attorney General Josh Stein reported that the pistol permit requirement was one of the state's most effective tools in keeping guns out of the hands of domestic abusers and felons.

References

Republican Party members of the North Carolina House of Representatives
Living people
21st-century American politicians
21st-century American women politicians
Women state legislators in North Carolina
1979 births